Eugenie Fish Glaman (1873 – 1956) was an American artist.

Collections
Art Institute of Chicago
Gilcrease Museum
Metropolitan Museum of Art, New York
New Mexico Museum of Art
Smithsonian American Art Museum
Wichita Art Museum

References

1873 births
1956 deaths
Artists from Missouri
20th-century American women artists
American women painters